The 21st British Academy Film Awards, given by the British Academy of Film and Television Arts in 1968, honoured the best films of 1967.

Winners and nominees
Source:

Statistics

See also
 40th Academy Awards
 20th Directors Guild of America Awards
 25th Golden Globe Awards
 20th Writers Guild of America Awards

References

External links
 "Film in 1968", BAFTA

Film021
1967 film awards
1968 in British cinema